Lo Chih-an (born 28 December 1988) is a Taiwanese football player who comes from Atayal tribe. Despite still being a high school student, Lo made his debut for Chinese Taipei national football team, together with his brother Lo Chih-en, and assisted the latter's first goal in the game against Guam of East Asian Cup 2008 preliminary competition on 17 June 2007.

In 2009, Lo and his twin brother Lo Chih-en received futsal training and were both called up to present Chinese Taipei in the 2010 AFC Futsal Championship.

References

External links
Lo Chih-an at EAFF Official Site

International goals
Scores and results list the Chinese Taipei's goal tally first.

1988 births
Living people
Atayal people
Taiwanese footballers
Taiwanese men's futsal players
People from Yilan County, Taiwan
Twin sportspeople
Taiwanese twins
Chinese Taipei international footballers
Association football midfielders
Association football forwards
National Pingtung University of Education alumni